The pound (abbreviation: LE in Latin,  in Arabic, historically also £E; ISO code: EGP) is the official currency of Egypt.

The new 20 and 10 Egyptian Pounds (LE) are made out of polymer plastic paper on July 6, 2022

History

In 1834, a khedival decree was issued, adopting an Egyptian currency based on a bimetallic standard (gold and silver) on the basis of the Maria Theresa thaler, a popular trade coin in the region. In 1885, the para ceased to be issued, and the piastre was divided into tenths. These tenths were renamed milliemes in 1916.

The legal exchange rates were fixed by force of law for important foreign currencies which became acceptable in the settlement of internal transactions. Eventually this led to Egypt using a de facto gold standard between 1885 and 1914, with LE 1 = 7.4375 grammes pure gold. At the outbreak of World War I, the Egyptian pound used a sterling peg of one pound and sixpence sterling to one Egyptian pound (£1 sterling = LE 0.975, or LE 1 = £1/–/6 stg).

Egypt remained part of the sterling area until 1962, when Egypt devalued slightly and switched to a peg to the United States dollar, at a rate of LE 1 = US$2.3. This peg was changed to LE 1 = US$2.55555 in 1973 when the dollar was devalued. The Egyptian pound floated in 1989. However, until 2001, the float was tightly managed by the Central Bank of Egypt and foreign exchange controls were in effect. After exhausting all of its policies to support the pound, the Central Bank of Egypt was forced to end the managed-float regime and allowed the currency to float freely on 3 November 2016; the bank also announced an end to foreign exchange controls that day. The official rate fell twofold.

The Egyptian pound was also used in Anglo-Egyptian Sudan between 1899 and 1956, and Cyrenaica when it was under British occupation and later an independent emirate between 1942 and 1951. It also circulated in Mandatory Palestine from 1918 to 1927, when the Palestine pound was introduced, equal in value to the pound sterling. The National Bank of Egypt issued banknotes for the first time on 3 April 1899. The Central Bank of Egypt and the National Bank of Egypt were unified into the Central Bank of Egypt in 1961.

Symbols and nomenclature

Notation and symbols
The Egyptian pound has no formal or single widely adopted currency sign. Historically, Egyptian banknotes and postage stamps used the letters 'LE' in a script typeface as a sign for the currency in the Latin alphabet.

When issued as a circulation coin the millieme was abbreviated to "m", "mill" or "mills".

Used for historical values or in vernacular speech
Several unofficial popular names are used to refer to different denominations of Egyptian currency. These include (from the word nickel) nekla  for 2 milliemes, ta'rifa  for 5 milliemes,   (i.e. a shilling) for 5 piastres, bariza  for 10 piastres, and reyal (ريال)  ("real") for 20 piastres. Since the piastre and millieme are no longer legal tender, the smallest denomination currently minted being the 25 PT. coin (functioning as one-quarter of LE 1), these terms have mostly fallen into disuse and survive as curios. A few have survived to refer to pound notes: bariza now refers to the LE 10 note and reyal can be used in reference to the LE 20 note.

Informal
Different sums of the Egyptian pound have nicknames in vernacular speech, for example: LE 1 bolbol (بلبل) meaning nightingale or gondi (جوندي) meaning soldier, LE 1,000 bako  "pack"; LE 1,000,000 arnab  "rabbit"; LE 1,000,000,000 feel  "elephant".

Coins 
Between 1837 and 1900, copper 1 and 5 para*, silver 10 and 20 para, 1, 5, 10 and 20 piastre (PT), gold 5 PT, 10 PT. and 20 PT and LE 1 coins were introduced, with gold 50 PT coins issued in 1839.

Copper 10 para coins were introduced in 1853, although the silver coin continued to be issued. Copper 10 para coins were again introduced in 1862, followed by copper 4 para and 2 PT coins in 1863. Gold 25 PT coins were introduced in 1867.

In 1885, the para was replaced by the millieme in order to decimalise the currency and a new coinage was introduced. The gold coinage practically ceased, with only small numbers of 5 PT and 10 PT coins issued.

In 1916 and 1917, a new base metal coinage was introduced consisting of bronze m and holed, cupro-nickel 1m, 2m, 5m and 10m coins. Silver 2 PT, 5 PT, 10 PT and 20 PT coins continued to be issued, and a gold LE 1 coin was reintroduced. Between 1922 and 1923, the gold coinage was extended to include 20 PT and 50 PT and LE 1 and LE 5 coins. In 1924, bronze replaced cupro-nickel in the 1m coin and the holes were removed from the other cupro-nickel coins. In 1938, bronze 5m and 10m coins were introduced, followed in 1944 by silver, hexagonal 2 PT coins.

Between 1954 and 1956, a new coinage was introduced, consisting of aluminium-bronze 1m, 5m and 10m and silver 5 PT, 10 PT and 20 PT coins, with the size of the silver coinage significantly reduced. An aluminium-bronze 2m coin was introduced in 1962. In 1967 the silver coinage was abandoned and cupro-nickel 5 and 10 piastre coins were introduced.

Aluminium replaced aluminium-bronze in the 1m, 5m and 10m coins in 1972, followed by brass in the 5m and 10m coins in 1973. Aluminium-bronze 2 PT and cupro-nickel 20 PT coins were introduced in 1980, followed by aluminium-bronze 1 PT and 5 PT coins in 1984. In 1992, brass 5 and 10 piastre coins were introduced, followed by holed, cupro-nickel 25 piastre coins in 1993. The size of 5 PT coins was reduced in 2004, 10 PT and 25 PT coins - in 2008.

On the 1st of June, 2006, 50 PT and LE 1 coins dated 2005 were introduced, and its equivalent banknotes were temporarily phased out from circulation in 2010. The coins bear the face of Cleopatra VII and Tutankhamun's mask, and the LE 1 coin is bimetallic. The size and composition of 50 PT coins was reduced in 2007.

Banknotes
In 1899, the National Bank of Egypt introduced notes in denominations of 50 PT, LE 1, LE 5, LE 10, LE 50 and LE 100. Between 1916 and 1917, 25 PT notes were added, together with government currency notes for 5 PT and 10 PT issued by the Ministry of Finance.

In 1961, the Central Bank of Egypt took over from the National Bank and issued notes in denominations of 25 and 50 piastres, LE 1, LE 5, LE 10 and LE 20 notes were introduced in 1976, followed by LE 100 in 1978, LE 50 in 1993 and LE 200 in 2007.

All Egyptian banknotes are bilingual, with Arabic texts and Eastern Arabic numerals on the obverse, and English texts and Western Arabic numerals on the reverse. Obverse designs tend to feature an Islamic building with reverse designs featuring Ancient Egyptian motifs (buildings, statues and inscriptions). During December 2006, it was mentioned in articles in Al Ahram and Al Akhbar newspapers that there were plans to introduce LE 200 and LE 500 notes. As of 2019, there are LE 200 notes circulating but there are still no plans for issuing LE 500 notes. Starting from 2011 the 25 PT, 50 PT and LE 1  banknotes were phased out in favour of more extensive use of coins. However, as of June 2016 the National Bank of Egypt reintroduced the LE 1 banknote into circulation as well as 25 PT and 50 PT notes in response to a shortage of small change.

The governor of the Central Bank of Egypt announced that the Central Bank of Egypt will issue polymer notes by the beginning of 2021. This change comes as the CBE moves its headquarters to the new administrative capital. On July 31, 2021, the President of Egypt reviewed the notes of LE 10 and LE 20, to be issued in November 2021. In August 2021, the Central Bank was forced to confirm that rainbow holograms on the new banknotes were a secure watermarking feature to prevent counterfeiting, after online critics suggested it was a covert message of support for LGBT rights.

Historical and current exchange rates

Sterling
This table shows the value of £1 sterling in Egyptian pounds:

US dollar

This table shows the historical value of US$1 in Egyptian currency (piastres prior to 1834, pounds thenceforth):

See also
 Economy of Egypt
 British currency in the Middle East

References

Bibliography

External links

 
 Historical and current banknotes of Egypt
 Information about Egyptian money
 Encyclopaedia of Egyptian Banknotes

Economy of Egypt
Currencies introduced in 1834
1834 establishments in Egypt